The Adversary is the debut solo album by Emperor frontman Ihsahn. Released on 10 April 2006, it is the first in a conceptual trilogy of albums including angL and After. It features a guest vocal appearance by Ulver's Garm.  The album has been noted for its stylistic diversity, encompassing extreme metal as well as progressive and classic metal influences.

Background
The album combines various extreme metal genres with progressive and classic metal in the vein of Judas Priest.   Ihsahn described The Adversary as "all over the place, with me trying out other subgenres in metal that I didn’t really have a go at before." He further explained of the album's diversity that it had its origins in a certain nostalgia:

Ihsahn described his intention with the production as realizing "a more sparse sound picture, inspired by more '70s metal. I also mixed that album in an analog studio with equipment from the '50s, '60s and '70s and didn't overdub any guitars."

Several songs quote Friedrich Nietzsche's Thus Spoke Zarathustra, which Ihsahn has cited this as a key influence "not just because of the philosophical themes, but also the beauty of the language, the whole kind of religious undertone in this very ungodly philosophy."

Track listing 
All songs written by Ihsahn.
 "Invocation" - 5:04
 "Called by the Fire" - 4:50
 "Citizen" - 5:18
 "Homecoming" - 4:17
 "Astera Ton Proinon" - 5:04
 "Panem et Circenses" - 4:49
 "And He Shall Walk in Empty Places" - 4:47
 "Will You Love Me Now?" - 4:57
 "The Pain is Still Mine" - 10:04

Personnel

Ihsahn 
 Ihsahn - vocals, all other instruments
 Asgeir Mickelson - drums
 Garm - guest vocalist on "Homecoming"

Production 
 Ihsahn - arrangements, engineering, production, and mixing
 Garm - engineering of vocals on track 4
 Tore Ylwizaker - engineering of vocals on track 4
 Asgeir Mickelson - engineering and editing of drums
 Tom Kvålsvoll - mastering

References

External links 
 "The Adversary" at discogs

2006 debut albums
Ihsahn albums